The New Statesman is a British sitcom made in the late 1980s and early 1990s satirising the United Kingdom's Conservative Party Government of the period. It was written by Laurence Marks and Maurice Gran at the request of, and as a starring vehicle for, its principal actor Rik Mayall.

Episodes

Series 1

Special 
Comic Relief (BBC1 - 5 February 1988) – Not technically an episode of The New Statesman, this was the first annual Red Nose Day telethon held by the Comic Relief charity. In the final skit, Alan arrives for a meeting with Margaret Thatcher. Thatcher's secretary Celia Imrie tells him she cannot see him because she's busy in a meeting with Cecil Parkinson "and a whip." making Rik Mayall break character briefly and doing a snippet of Richie Rich before saying, "But of course, that was a different series."

Alan persuades Thatcher to shut down the BBC, at which point the episode fades to black. An announcer announces the end of the BBC, following which a series of (impersonated) BBC stars are heard departing the BBC.

In the post-shutdown darkness Alan makes a pass at Thatcher, who asks "You just wanted to get a snog out of me, is that right, Bastard?". Alan replies "Yes, Prime Minister", dropping his trousers to reveal Union Jack boxer shorts, and the episode concludes with the closing titles in the style of, and with the theme tune of, Yes, Prime Minister.

Series 2

Series 3

Series 4

Stage show 
Episode 2006: The Blair B'Stard Project – Alan B'Stard has created New Labour after making billions on Black Wednesday, installing a failed singer as prime minister and secretly running the country from his bunker at number 9 Downing Street. The show sees Alan attempting to settle a divorce from his wife while playing Al-Qaeda and the Americans off each other in the hunt for weapons of mass destruction (which are being carefully hidden by Alan). Aided by his PPS Frank, the last socialist in the Labour Party and Flora, an ex-Young Conservative turned Blairite lackey, Alan arranges the fake kidnapping of Tony Blair and the ruining of Gordon Brown in order to place himself in ultimate power. The show ends with Alan being named Lord Protector with the declaration, "And Alan takes EVERYTHING".

ALAN B'STARD'S EXTREMELY SECRET WEAPON – The stage show returns, heavily re-written in late 2006, touring into 2007. Alan is plotting to become one of a shadowy elite of politicians who control the world's oil supplies.

NOtoAV 
In 2011, the character of Alan B'Stard, again portrayed by Rik Mayall, was used in the campaign against introducing the AV system to UK Parliamentary elections, in an official television broadcast by NOtoAV. B'Stard appears as a party leader in the near future who, at a pre-general election conference, makes ridiculous promises to the public including the abolition of all taxes and free electricity. When his aides query how they will afford such policies, B'Stard gleefully explains that he won't have to, as when he gets elected, he can go into coalition and blame all the government's failings on his partners. He adds that under AV, even if people don't vote for him he'll probably be elected anyway. The advert ends with B'Stard entering Number 10 as prime minister, accompanied by another party leader.

References

External links 
 

Lists of British sitcom episodes